Briseida Acosta Balarezo (born 30 August 1993) is a Mexican taekwondo athlete. She won the silver medal at the 2013 World Taekwondo Championships on the women's heavyweights and the bronze medal at the 2019 World Taekwondo Championships on the same weight category.

References

External links
 

1993 births
Living people
Mexican female taekwondo practitioners
Universiade medalists in taekwondo
Universiade bronze medalists for Mexico
Taekwondo practitioners at the 2010 Summer Youth Olympics
Pan American Games medalists in taekwondo
Pan American Games gold medalists for Mexico
Taekwondo practitioners at the 2019 Pan American Games
World Taekwondo Championships medalists
Pan American Taekwondo Championships medalists
Medalists at the 2017 Summer Universiade
Medalists at the 2019 Pan American Games
Taekwondo practitioners at the 2020 Summer Olympics
Olympic taekwondo practitioners of Mexico
People from Navolato
Sportspeople from Sinaloa
21st-century Mexican women